Ludwig Redtenbacher (June 10, 1814 in Kirchdorf an der Krems, Austria – February 8, 1876 in Vienna) was an Austrian doctor and entomologist mainly interested in beetles.

Life
Ludwig Redtenbacher was the brother of the chemist Josef Redtenbacher (1810–1870).

From 1833 to 1838, Ludwig Redtenbacher studied medicine at the University of Vienna, becoming a salaried trainee in 1840. In 1843, he earned his medical doctorate, afterwards working as an assistant with the entomological collection of the Hofnaturalienkabinett (from 1847). In 1851, he became a professor of zoology in Prague and, from 1860, he was director of the Vienna Natural History Museum.

Although Redtenbacher worked mainly on the beetles of Austria, his new approach to classification or, in German, "analytischen" was widely adopted. He is also significant for his work involving beetles collected on the voyage of the Novara, an Austrian frigate that went on a round-the-world scientific expedition between 1857 and 1859.

He also described many of the beetles collected by Ida Pfeiffer (1797-1858). He wrote the entomological portion of Joseph Russegger's Reisen in Europa, Asien und Afrika (Travels in Europe, Asia and Africa).

Honours
In 1848, Carl Eduard Hammerschmidt named comadia redtenbacheri, known as the caterpillar placed in bottles of mezcal, in honour of Ludwig Redtenbacher.

The Redtenbachergasse in the Viennese districts of Ottakring and Hernals was named in his honor in 1894.

Literary works 
His most significant works were:
 Die Gattungen der deutschen Käfer-Fauna nach der analytischen Methode, 1845 - Genera of  German beetle fauna via the "analytical method".
 Reise der österreichischen Fregatte Novara um die Erde in den Jahren 1857, 1858,1859 unter den befehlen des Commodore B. von Wüllerstorf-Urbair. Zoologischer Theil. Zweiter Band: Coleopteren. 249 pp., illus. (1868)
 Fauna Austriaca. Die Käfer, nach der analytischen Methode bearbeitet. Wien : Karl Gerold 1st Edn. xxvii 883 pp. (1849). Second expanded and revised edition 1858, third edition 1874.

Beetles 
 

 Mesoprionus persicus, described in 1850

References

External links 
 Österreich Lexicon portrait
 WorldCat Identities (list of publications).

Austrian entomologists
Coleopterists
 01
1814 births
1878 deaths
Austrian taxonomists
People from Kirchdorf an der Krems
19th-century Austrian physicians
19th-century Austrian zoologists